Kasa, or Jóola-Kaasa (also Bacuki, Casa, etc.) is a Jola language of the Casamance region of Senegal and neighboring Gambia.

Dialects are Ayun, Bliss (Niomoun), Esulalu (Oussouye), Fluvial, Huluf, Selek.

In Oussouye (Husuy) dialect, a person is referred to as a-luf.

References

Languages of Senegal
Jola languages